Muhammad az-Zaruq Rajab (born 1940) was a former Head of State and General Secretary of the People's Committee (Prime Minister) in Libya.

Rajab was General Secretary of the General People's Congress from January 7, 1981 to February 15, 1984, From 16 February 1984 to 3 March 1986 he was the Prime Minister of Libya. Previously, he was Minister of Treasury from 1972 to 1977, and Secretary of Finance from 1977 to 1981.

References

Prime Ministers of Libya
1940 births
Living people
Heads of state of Libya
Secretaries-General of the General People's Congress
Governors of the Central Bank of Libya
Finance ministers of Libya